The Brooklyn Paramount Theater is a former movie palace at 1 University Plaza at the intersection of Flatbush and DeKalb Avenues in downtown Brooklyn, New York. Opened in 1928, the building has been owned by Long Island University (LIU) since 1954. Converted for use by LIU as classroom space and a gymnasium, the building retains much of the theater's original decorative detail.  Until recently the venue operated as a 1200-seat multi-purpose arena, formerly home to the Brooklyn Kings basketball team. It is now in the planning stages of a renovation to reopen the theater as a performing arts venue in 2019.

History

Theater

Paramount Pictures constructed the venue in 1928 and selected the Chicago theater architect team Rapp and Rapp as designers.  The studio constructed a sister Paramount Theatre in Times Square, Manhattan. The rococo-designed theater had 4,084 seats covered in burgundy velvet, with a ceiling painted with clouds. The auditorium featured a  stage curtain decorated with satin-embroidered pheasants and huge chandeliers and fountains with goldfish adorned the lobby space.

According to anthropology professor Michael Hittman, "while the Brooklyn Paramount is remembered as a popular movie house and early home of rock ‘n’ roll, it is a little known fact that it helped introduce Brooklyn to jazz, with artists like  Dizzy Gillespie, Ella Fitzgerald and Miles Davis." Duke Ellington first played at the Paramount in 1931. The most famous star connected with the theater was composer and radio personality, Russ Columbo, who performed at the theater during the early 1930s. Columbo had the most sold-out performances on record at the theater that would not be broken for quarter of a century, during the promoter created Battle of The Baritones (source: multiple biographies, newspaper and magazine articles, incl. Prisoner of Love by Tony Toran and The Joe Franklin Show (TV interview Bing Crosby). The theater promoters pitted Bing Crosby and Columbo against each other at two different Paramount Theaters, encouraging audience members to compare the two. According to the (Dutch) biography 'De Keizer van het Jiddische Lied' it was in 1943 that singer Leo Fuld introduced Yiddish music on this stage. In the 1950s, Alan Freed’s rock ‘n’ roll shows played at the theater, with acts including Chuck Berry and Fats Domino. Buddy Holly played a show in September 1957.

When Alan Freed fell victim of the payola scandal, TV host Clay Cole continued the ten-day holiday show tradition, in shows produced by Sid Bernstein. The first, Clay Cole's Christmas Show broke all existing attendance records with a show featuring Ray Charles, Bobby Rydell, Brenda Lee, Neil Sedaka, Johnny Burnett, The Delicates, Kathy Young, Dion, Bobby Vinton, Bo Diddley, Chubby Checker, Bobby Vee and groups, the Drifters, Coasters, Shirelles, the Supremes, and Little Anthony & The Imperials. The last live rock 'n' roll stage show at The Brooklyn Paramount was "Clay Cole's Easter Parade of Stars" headlining Jackie Wilson and an all-star cast. Then the theater was shuttered.

The General Manager of the theater was Eugene Pleshette, father of the actress Suzanne Pleshette.  Long Island University purchased the structure for part of its  Brooklyn Campus in 1960 and converted into its current use as a gymnasium for LIU in 1962.

The Wurlitzer organ in the Brooklyn Paramount, Opus 1984, is a four manual, 26 rank instrument with 1,838 pipes and continues to be used at LIU sporting events.

Anthropology/Sociology Professor Dr. Michael Hittman presented an all-day seminar, a one-credit cross-linked course with emphasis on rock 'n' roll on March 27, 2009, at the LIU Brooklyn campus library. Clay Cole was the keynote speaker and hosted panel discussions on the connections between rock 'n' roll and the historic Paramount Theater. The seminar  concluded with a 90-minute doo wop show, with artists.

Sports venue
In 1962 the Paramount Theater was converted by Long Island University for various uses. The auditorium was adapted as a gymnasium, now called the Arnold and Marie Schwartz Athletic Center.

LIU renamed the Brooklyn Paramount building Metcalfe Hall after the University's first president, Tristram Walker Metcalfe. Metcalfe is remembered for his announcement in 1936 that LIU's Blackbirds basketball team had refused to attend Germany's Olympics due to Hitler's discrimination against Jews.

The former Paramount was the home of the LIU Blackbirds basketball team until 2005. The Northeast Conference men's basketball tournament was held here three times. Since the Blackbirds moved to the LIU Athletic, Recreation & Wellness Center, the venue has served as an occasional host of Gotham Girls Roller Derby bouts and as the home of the Brooklyn Kings of the now-dormant USBL.

Renovation
In April 2015, LIU announced a 49-year lease of the Paramount to a company controlled by Bruce Ratner and Mikhail Prokhorov, owners of the Barclays Center and the Brooklyn Nets. They plan an extensive renovation costing about $50 million, overseen by the firm of Hugh Hardy, to convert the auditorium back to a theater for live events. Many of the original Rapp & Rapp architectural details remain and will be preserved, as will the Wurlitzer organ. As of 2018, the project was expected to be completed in mid 2019. In 2020 the project was reported to have been delayed.

References

External links
 
 Cinema Treasures listing
 Long Island University
 Clay Cole's show at Brooklyn Paramount
 Paramount Wurlitzer organ New York Theater Organ Society

1928 establishments in New York City
Basketball venues in New York City
Cinemas and movie theaters in New York City
Defunct college basketball venues in the United States
Downtown Brooklyn
Former cinemas in the United States
Indoor arenas in New York City
LIU Brooklyn Blackbirds basketball
Movie palaces
Public venues with a theatre organ
Sports venues in Brooklyn
Theatres in Brooklyn